Henry "Tracker" Young (16 May 1873 – 9 January 1923) was an Australian rules footballer in the Victorian Football League (VFL). A successful participant in numerous sports he was master of them all. He commanded respect whether it was on the football field, the boxing ring, riding in the Melbourne to Warrnambool road race, or rowing on Corio Bay.

Tracker's fitness was that impressive that it is well known that he ran 30 plus kilometres along the beach to the game, play four quarters in the ruck and then ran 30 kilometres back home.

Family 
The son of Samuel Young (1840–1923), and Margaret Young (–1926), née Calhoun, Henry Young was born in Geelong on 16 May 1873.

He married Ruby May Gaylard (1886–1940) in 1920. Ruby remarried in 1923. Both she and her second husband, Leslie Alexander Eastgate, died as the result of an accident on 20 December 1940.

Football
Young was an outstanding tap-ruckman who was allegedly never beaten in a game. Tracker was recruited from Wellington, a local team and first played in the Victorian Football Association days. 

A supremely athletic and fit person, it allowed him to ruck for four quarters, often brilliantly and with a dominating effect on his opponents, such was the consistency of his play the opposing rovers tried to feed off his hit outs. Strong and courageous, and a magnificent high mark he displayed a cool temperament and always at the forefront of protecting his teammates with effective shepherding.

Tracker sustained serious injury problems in 1898 and 1899, however he made a strong comeback and throughout his career provided tremendous service and was inspirational to his teammates as club captain (137 games as captain).

Tracker also won the Geelong Best and Fairest Award (pre-Carji Greeves Medal) in 1905 and 1906.

Rowing
An outstanding oarsman, he was the honorary rowing coach of Geelong College from 1917 until his death in 1923.

Death
Young died of heart failure — "having been under special treatment for heart trouble during the last four months" — at the age of 49, shortly after a swim.
"With the death of Henry Young Geelong has lost its greatest athlete. As a citizen and a comrade the loss is still greater. He was a good club man and friend, and played the game, no matter what it might be, with all the vigor and power that was in him. He took care that he was always physically fit, and gave of his best to the side, and help to a mate who needed it in a hard contest. To friend and foe alike, he always played his hardest, but always played the game, with the result that he had not an enemy among those against whom he competed. At the close of a contest, no matter how vigorous it was, or how the result went, he would give or accept congratulations, knowing that, on his part, there was no incident to have regret over. He was never happier than when imparting knowledge to a beginner."Charles Brownlow (chairman of the Australian Football Council, and secretary of the Geelong Football Club).

Recognition
In 1996 he was inducted (as one of 138 inductees) into the inaugural AFL Hall of Fame.

In 1996, he was named as the resting forward-pocket ruckman in the Geelong Football Club's Team of the Century; and, in 2002, he was declared to be one of the Geelong Football Club Legends, among the inaugural group of 20 highly significant former players.

See also
 1908 Melbourne Carnival

Footnotes

References 
 'Follower', "The Footballers' Alphabet", The Leader, (Saturday, 23 July 1898), p.17.
 'Cover Point', "A Great Footballer: 'Tracker' Young's Career", The (Melbourne) Herald, (Wednesday, 10 January 1923), p.6.</ref>
 Pivot Sportsmen Honored: Touching Tributes, The Sporting Globe, (Saturday, 22 June 1929), p.5.
 Ross, J. (ed), 100 Years of Australian Football 1897–1996: The Complete Story of the AFL, All the Big Stories, All the Great Pictures, All the Champions, Every AFL Season Reported, Viking, (Ringwood), 1996.

External links

 Boyles Football Photos: Henry Young.

1873 births
1923 deaths
Australian Rules footballers: place kick exponents
Australian Football Hall of Fame inductees
Carji Greeves Medal winners
Geelong Football Club players
Geelong Football Club (VFA) players
Australian rules footballers from Geelong